Suad Ibrahim Abdi is a women's rights activist from Somaliland.  She was the  country representative for Progressio and also an active campaigner to open up democracy for women in the country for over 25 years.   She is running for a seat in parliament from Maroodi Jeex in this years elections, to be held on May 31,2021.

Career 
Suad Ibrahim Abdi has been a social activist in Somaliland since 1996.  She is a member of the Somaliland National Women's Network (Nagaad) which she helped to found in 1997.  She is the Somaliland national representative for Progressio, an international non-governmental organisation campaigning for democracy in the country.  Progressio has supplied specialists to support the work of local organisations working in the field and provided observers for the 2010 Somaliland presidential election which it declared free and fair.

Abdi is campaigning for the implementation of a 20% quota of Somaliland's MPs to be female.  Currently only one member of parliament out of 164 is female.  Two previous parliamentary bills were blocked by the House of Elders (upper house) or ran out of debating time.  Abdi said she would stand in the 2015 elections (postponed to 2017) but would not seek to become a government minister.

References 

Living people
Somaliland women in politics
Democracy activists
Somalian women's rights activists
21st-century Somalil women politicians
Year of birth missing (living people)